The Nimbus EosXi is an Italian unmanned aerial vehicle (UAV) designed for civilian use, developed and manufactured by NIMBUS Srl.

EOS XI is a hybrid airship having a large, gas-filled delta wing which provides both aerostatic and aerodynamic lift, referred to by the manufacturer as a "metaplane". The cabin, tail assembly and propulsion system are suspended below the wing.

Description
Although classified as an aerodyne (an aircraft heavier than air), the additional aerostatic lift allows extremely short take-off and landing (STOL) distances. Unlike conventional aircraft,  which use adjustable control surfaces known as ailerons to maneuver in flight, the EosXi wing is a stiff structure with no moving parts. The craft uses only the suspended tail assembly's moveable planes for course and attitude control, relying on the wing's aerostatic lift to enhance stability. The large wing has a low wing loading that contributes to the vehicle's STOL characteristics.

The wing envelope has a multi-layer construction to obtain the required lightness, strength and aerodynamic characteristics.

The EosXi is claimed to have exceptional stability, due to its low centre of gravity, while the moveable tail surfaces are claimed to give high maneuverability. The delta wing is claimed to allow stable flight even when stalled, which in turn allows steep flight slope angles and extremely low velocity flight with STOL capability.

Specifications

See also
 Aerostat
 Aerodyne

References

Notes

Bibliography 
 M. Morrison, Italy special: beyond Turin, Flightglobal, November 13, 2007
 NIMBUS EOS XI, TURIN MARATHON, Tutta Dritta, December 18, 2009
 SkyMedia and Nimbus at PROTEC 2011, SkyMedia, Tuesday, July 19, 2011
 R. Taurino, Simulazione numerica del Campo Aerodinamico prossimo ad un metaplano. Progetto D-Fly, Politecnico di Torino, 2007
 A. Nassisi, "Progetto di un sistema di georeferenziazione e visualizzazione di flussi video", Politecnico di Torino, 2009
 D. Trèves, "Progetto di una Ground Control Station di un Unmanned Aerial System", Politecnico di Torino, 2009
 J. Pellissier, Aerospaziale, corsa ai fondi Ue, ItaliaOggi, March 1, 2007
 A. Lo Campo, Torino capofila dei distretti aerospaziali, LA STAMPA, Torino, March 1, 2007
 O. Giustetti, Piccole e medie imprese alleate Ecco la carta per l'innovazione, la Repubblica, Torino, March 3, 2007
 A. Settefonti, Le aziende di Torino guardano tutti dall'alto Con il velivolo D-fly, FINANZA MERCATI, March 8, 2007
 K. Plucinski, Simulatore di volo light UAV: la missione progetto SMAT_F1, Technologie e Servizi per la Protezione Civile e Ambientale, PROTEC, Torino, June 30, 2011
 M. Traverso, Un ultraleggero senza pilota targato Pmi, il Giornale del Piemonte, March 8, 2007
 J. Pellissier, Piemonte via al d-fly, velivolo Uas, ItaliaOggi, March 8, 2007
 Decolla "D-fly" velivolo leggero ideato dalle Pmi, la Repubblica, Torino, March 8, 2007
 L'aereo "spia" sarà costruito in canavese, TORINOCRONACA, March 9, 2007
 Vola senza pilota ma vede e sente tutto, LA STAMPA, Torino, March 12, 2007
 R. Chiaramonti, Aerospazio al decollo pur senza riconoscimenti, 24 ORE NordOvest, March 14, 2007
 A. Previati, Volo sperimentale del <<D-Fly>> della Nimbus, IL CANAVESE, March 16, 2007
 A. Pascale, Processi di certificazione di un UAV secondo la normativa CS-VLA, Politecnico di Torino, 2011
 Il drone ultraleggero, Panorama, January 13, 2012

External links
NIMBUS Srl Website 

Unmanned aerial vehicles of Italy
Airships of Italy